Msata is an administrative ward and town in Chalinze District of Pwani Region in Tanzania. 
According to the 2012 census, the ward has a total population of 13,740.

References

Populated places in Pwani Region